Ephedra breana (frutilla de campo, pingo-pingo) is a species of Ephedra growing from northwest Argentina through to Chile and Bolivia.

Synonyms 
 Ephedra haenkeana Tocl
 Ephedra wraithiana I.M.Johnst.

References 

 JSTOR entry
 The Plant List entry
 IUCN Redlist entry

breana